Sir Edward Bayntun-Rolt, 1st Baronet  (1710–1800) was a British landowner and Whig politician who sat in the House of Commons for 43 years from 1737 to 1780.  His election in 1741 was instrumental in the downfall of Sir Robert Walpole's premiership.

Early life
Bayntun-Rolt was the second son of Edward Rolt of Sacombe, Hertfordshire and his wife Anne Bayntun, daughter of Henry Bayntun of Spye Park. Following the death of his uncle John Bayntun, he succeeded to the Bayntun properties at  Spye Park  and elsewhere in 1717, and took the additional name of Bayntun.

Political career
Bayntun-Rolt's estate brought him  a major interest in the parliamentary seat at Chippenham. He was returned as an opposition Whig Member of Parliament  at a by-election on 22 June 1737. At the 1741 general election  he was re-elected with Sir Edmond Thomas, another opposition candidate, after a contest against two government candidates. The two defeated government candidates petitioned and the outcome became a trial of strength between Sir Robert Walpole and his opponents. On 31 January 1742  the petition was rejected  by 16 votes. This event led to Walpole's resignation after 20 years as Prime Minister.

Bayntun-Rolt was appointed a groom of the bedchamber to Frederick, Prince of Wales in 1745 but was dismissed in March 1746. At the 1747 general election  he was given a secret service grant of £800 towards his expenses. After the Prince of Wales's death in 1751, he was made surveyor general to the Duchy of Cornwall at £466 a year and held the post for forty-five years.

Bayntun-Rolt was again given a secret service grant at the 1754 general election and in  1761, although the Government granted no money for elections, the Earl of Bute arranged a pension of £300 on the Duchy of Cornwall for him. He was created baronet on  7 July 1762. He was returned again as MP for Chippenham in 1768 and 1774. He did not stand in the 1780 general election.

Family life and legacy
Bayntun-Rolt married Mary Poynter (1718-99) of Herriard, Hampshire before 1743, and again 15 January 1750 at Parish Church, Shoreham, Kent, with issue:
Andrew Bayntun-Rolt (1755-1816), 2nd and last Baronet
Elizabeth Bayntun-Rolt (1758-98), who married Henry Stone

Mary died 26 March 1799 at Spye Park.

Bayntun-Rolt died on 3 January 1800. He was succeeded in the baronetcy by his son Andrew.

A memorial exists in St Nicholas' Church, Bromham, Wiltshire.

Ancestors

References

1710 births
1800 deaths
Baronets in the Baronetage of Great Britain
British MPs 1734–1741
British MPs 1741–1747
British MPs 1747–1754
British MPs 1754–1761
British MPs 1761–1768
British MPs 1768–1774
British MPs 1774–1780
Members of the Parliament of Great Britain for English constituencies
People from Hertfordshire (before 1965)
People from Wiltshire
Burials in Wiltshire